is a Japanese footballer who plays for Fujieda MYFC.

Club statistics
Updated to 23 February 2019.

References

External links

Profile at Roasso Kumamoto
Profile at Azul Claro Numazu
Profile at Fujieda MYFC

1992 births
Living people
Komazawa University alumni
Association football people from Kumamoto Prefecture
Japanese footballers
J2 League players
J3 League players
Roasso Kumamoto players
Azul Claro Numazu players
Fujieda MYFC players
Association football midfielders